Turma do Pererê, or just Pererê, was a Brazilian comic book series created by writer and cartoonist Ziraldo in 1959. The series was originally launched in  single-panel cartoons originally published in the pages of magazine O Cruzeiro that through their popularity eventually earning his own comic book in 1960 then called only "Pererê", one of the first children's comic books series in Brazil. The comics tagged generation among many Brazilians, but were eventually canceled in 1964, only returning to be published in 1975 by Abril with the current title "Turma do Pererê" which was canceled the following year and shall have only republications in subsequent years, until 1980 when he dedicated to the comics of the Menino Maluquinho.

The stories showed the adventures of Saci Pererê (a character of Brazilian folklore) and his friends who live in the Brazilian interior forest known as Mata do Fundão.

Characters 
Pererê - The title character of the series, being a Saci who lives in Fundão. Unlike the Sacis of folklore, Pererê is characterized by being more domesticated, preferring not to cause pranks, however, he is always having fun with his friends and often walks inside whirlpools. In one of the comics it is revealed that he was born from a black flower planted by Mãe Docelina, whom he sees as a mother figure. He is usually just referred to as Saci by the characters.
Tininim - A indigenous Brazilian boy that is Pererê's best friend. He is very sensitive, paranoid and fearful, he often gets into trouble from which he always needs his friend's help to help him. One of his main fears are the diseases.
Galileu, a white jaguar with brown spots.
Geraldinho, a red rabbit
Moacir, a pink tortoise
Alan, a monkey
Pedro Vieira, a pink armadillo
Joao-de-Barro Pimentel and his wife Quiquica, a bird couple
Boneca, Pererê's girlfriend
Tuiuiú, Tininim's girlfriend
Compadre Tonico and Sêo Neném, two farmers who try to hunt Galileu
Professor Nogueira, a wise yellow owl
Mãe Docelina, an old lady baker

Adaptations 
With the legacy of the series on October 12, 1983 Rede Globo produced a live-action television special in celebration of Children's Day. The special musical served as the basis of inspiration for a TV series that was produced in 1998 with the same structure produced by the channel TVE Brasil (current TV Brasil) which was broadcast from 2002 to 2004, when the channel started to dedicate a series of Menino Maluquinho. For some years, it was also broadcast on TV Cultura.

In 2011, celebrating 50 years of comics were announced a film in animation and his return to comics, but so far nothing has been confirmed. In the same year the TV series gained new episodes this time with new actors acting characters.

Reception 
Pererê is considered one of the most important Brazilian comics to be remembered throughout generations. The comic is often referred to for having innovated when seeking to explore themes of Brazilian folklore, fauna and culture (one of them for being to explore the mythological creature Saci in the media), as well as the fact that it was the first Brazilian children's magazine entirely in color, serving as an inspiration for other future Brazilian comics.

As it was one of the most important works in Ziraldo's career, Pererê's characters are often referenced in other works by the author. One of them occurs in the first O Menino Maluquinho film.

References 

Brazilian comics titles
Brazilian mythology in popular culture
Comics adapted into television series
1959 comics debuts
1964 comics endings
Fictional Brazilian people
Fantasy comics
Child characters in comics
Comics characters introduced in 1959
Comics about animals
Comics about monkeys
Comics about cats
Comics about rabbits and hares
Gag cartoon comics